A/B is the second studio album by Icelandic rock band Kaleo. It was released on 10 June 2016 through Elektra Records.

Critical reception

A/B received generally favourable reviews from music critics, some of which praised Jökull Júlíusson's vocals, as well as the songs "No Good" and "All the Pretty Girls". Kate Hutchinson from The Guardian, however, thought it lacked originality, seeing the pieces as taking inspiration from the Black Keys ("Hot Blood"), James Bay ("Way Down We Go"), Bon Iver ("All the Pretty Girls") and Kings of Leon (much of the rest).

The track "Glass House" was featured in the soundtrack of Madden NFL 17 and as DLC for Rock Band 4. The track "Hot Blood" is featured in NHL 18, Far Cry 5 and Asphalt 9: Legends. The track "Way Down We Go" was featured in FIFA 16 and in the trailer for the 2017 film, Logan.

Track listing

Charts

Weekly charts

Year-end charts

Certifications

References

2016 albums
Elektra Records albums